The Novaya is a river in Krasnoyarsk Krai in Russia. It is a left tributary of the Khatanga. It originates in Lake Gavrila. It flows through the North Siberian Lowland in the Taymyrsky Dolgano-Nenetsky District. It is mostly fed by rain and snow melt.

References

Rivers of Krasnoyarsk Krai